Zhuangwei Township or Jhuangwei Township is a rural township in eastern Yilan County, Taiwan Province, Republic of China, the smallest in the county.

Geography

 Area: 
 Population: 24,402 (February 2023)

Politics and government

Administrative divisions
The township comprises 14 villages:
 Dafu, Fuxing/Fusing, Gonglao, Gujie, Guoling, Guting, Jixiang/Jisiang, Meicheng, Meifu, Donggang, Xinnan/Sinnan, Xinshe/Sinshe, Yongzhen/Yongjhen and Zhongxiao/Jhongsiao.

Elections
The township participated in the 2018 Taiwanese municipal elections supporting the candidacy of Lin Zi-miao (KMT).

Energy
The township government is currently constructing an organic refuse resource center to process 200 tons of refuse daily with a planned capacity of 400 kW.

Tourist attractions
 Wujian Ziyun Temple
 Yongzhen Coast Park

Transportation
The nearest train station to the township is Yilan Station of Taiwan Railways, located in Yilan City.

Notable natives
 Pan Wen-chung, Minister of Education (2016-2018, 2019-)
 Tsai Ling-yi, Second Lady of the Republic of China (2012–2016)

References

External links

  

Townships in Yilan County, Taiwan